Whispering Angel is a rosé wine from the Côtes de Provence AOC in Provence, France. It is produced by Chateau d'Esclans, which is majority owned by LVMH. It is credited with reviving interest in rosé wine. It is priced expensively for a rosé to create the perception of a premium product.

References

Rosé wines
Provence wine AOCs
LVMH